The Commonwealth Secretariat Act 1966 was an act of the Parliament of the United Kingdom that established the legal character of the Secretariat of the Commonwealth of Nations.  The act granted the Secretariat full legal immunity.  It was applied retroactively to 1 July 1965, when the Secretariat was constituted.

Until the International Organisations Act 2005, the act did not grant employees of the Secretariat exemption from paying income tax, but this was granted with the passage of the later act.

External links

Commonwealth Secretariat
History of the Commonwealth of Nations
United Kingdom Acts of Parliament 1966